The years of 2015 to 2019 saw the number of LGBTQ characters, building upon progress from 2010 to 2014, in animated series increase, changing the landscape when it came to representation. This includes Western animated series such as The Loud House, Danger & Eggs, Mysticons, OK K.O.! Let's Be Heroes, Castlevania, Big Mouth, She-Ra and the Princesses of Power, Twelve Forever, Craig of the Creek, Harley Quinn, and Hazbin Hotel. LGBTQ characters also appeared prominently in anime such as Flip Flappers, Miss Kobayashi's Dragon Maid, Bloom Into You, and Given.

This list only includes recurring characters, otherwise known as supporting characters, which appear frequently from time to time during the series' run, often playing major roles in more than one episode, and those in the main cast are listed below. LGBTQ characters which are guest stars or one-off characters are listed on the pages focusing exclusively on gay (in animation and anime), lesbian (in animation and anime), bisexual (in animation and anime), trans, pansexual, asexual, non-binary, and intersex characters.

The entries on this page are organized alphanumerically by duration dates and then alphabetically by the first letter of a specific series.

2015

2016

2017

2018

2019

See also

 List of yuri anime and manga
 List of LGBT-related films by year
 List of animated films with LGBT characters.

Notes

References

Citations

Sources
 
 
 

2010s animated television series
2010s-related lists
Animated
Lists of animated series
 
2010s LGBT-related television series